Gary Dunn is an American football coach.  He is the head football coach at California University of Pennsylvania.  In his first season as head coach, in 2016, he led the California Vulcans to a Pennsylvania State Athletic Conference (PSAC) championship and a birth in the NCAA Division II Football Championship.

Coaching career
While at Morehead State, Dunn served as the offensive coordinator for 11 seasons after spending two seasons as the offensive line and tight ends coach. In 2000, the Morehead State Eagles led the NCAA Division I Football Championship Subdivision (FCS) with 41.6 points and 523.9 yards of total offense behind the play of quarterback Dave Dinkins, a native of Pittsburgh. Morehead State matched the winningest season in school history in 2002, finishing with a 9–3 overall record behind an offense that ranked ninth in the country with 425.7 yards of total offense per game.

In 2011, the Duquesne Dukes registered their winningest season in nearly a decade with a 9–2 mark. Duquesne led the Northeast Conference (NEC) with 212.8 rushing yards per game and ranked second in the league with 33.7 points and 415.3 yards of total offense per game.

In 2015, the Dukes finished with an 8–4 overall record and made the program's first appearance in the FCS playoffs. Dunn worked with the top-ranked offense in the (NEC), as Duquesne led the league with 30.7 points, 416.5 yards of total offense, 171.8 rushing yards and 244.8 passing yards per game. Dunn helped Duquesne post a winning season five times in his six years with the program, while earning at least a share of three NEC titles (2011, 2013, 2015).

Head coaching record

References

External links
 California profile

Year of birth missing (living people)
1970s births
Living people
American football offensive linemen
California Vulcans football coaches
California Vulcans football players
Duquesne Dukes football coaches
Morehead State Eagles football coaches
Sportspeople from Pittsburgh
Players of American football from Pittsburgh